A pressure cooker is a sealed vessel for cooking food under steam pressure.

Pressure cooker may also refer to:

Cooking
Pressure fryer
Steam digester

Art, entertainment, and media
 Pressure Cooker (band), U.S. reggae band from Boston
 Pressure Cooker (2008 film), American documentary film
 Pressure Cooker (2020 film), Indian comedy film
 Pressure Cooker (video game), 1983 game for the Atari 2600
 Pressurecooker, 1997 short film
 The Pressure Cooker, a 2008 Irish documentary
 Riddim Driven: Pressure Cooker, a 2001 compilation album produced by VP Records
 Pressure Cooker (album)

See also
 Pressure cooker bomb, a type of home-made bomb similar to a pipe bomb
 Pressure Cookin', a 1973 album by American singing trio Labelle